This is a list of notable teachers who married their students.

 Peter Abélard married Héloïse d'Argenteuil
 Jackie Battley married future U.S. House Speaker Newt Gingrich (1962)
Abhijit Banerjee, economist, had children with and later married economist Esther Duflo, and they later jointly won the Nobel Prize for Economics together.
 Charles Melville Dewey married Julia Henshaw
 Abigail Fillmore married Millard Filmore, a future President of the United States.
 James Earle Fraser married Laura Gardin Fraser  (1913)
 Robert Henri was twice married to students of his, Linda Craige (1898) and Marjorie Organ (1908)
 Walter Kerr married Jean Kerr in 1943.
 Aliza Kezeradze married Ivo Pogorelić in 1980.
 Mary Kay Letourneau married Vili Fualaau in 2005.
 Arthur Frank Mathews married Lucia Kleinhans.
 Olivier Messiaen married Yvonne Loriod.
 Brigitte Trogneux married her former high school student Emmanuel Macron in 2007, who became President of France.

References

Pupils by teacher
Teachers who married their students
Teachers who married their students